H41 may refer to:
 , an oceanographic research vessel
 Cessna H-41 Seneca, an American helicopter
 Federal Reserve Statistical Release H.4.1
 Hanriot H.41, a French military trainer aircraft 
 , a Royal Navy A-class destroyer
 , a Royal Navy H-class submarine
 , a Royal Navy R-class destroyer